Cornwall Council in England, UK, was established in 2009 and is elected every four years. From 1973 to 2005 elections were for Cornwall County Council, with the first election for the new unitary Cornwall Council held in June 2009. This election saw 123 members elected, replacing the previous 82 councillors on Cornwall County Council and the 249 on the six district and borough councils (Caradon, Carrick, Kerrier, North Cornwall, Penwith, and Restormel). In June 2013 the Local Government Boundary Commission for England announced a public consultation on its proposal that Cornwall Council should have 87 councillors in future.

Political control
Cornwall County Council was first created in 1889. Its powers and responsibilities were significantly reformed under the Local Government Act 1972, with a new council elected in 1973 to act as a shadow authority ahead of the new powers coming into force in 1974. Since 1973, political control of the council has been held by the following parties:

Non-metropolitan county

Unitary authority

Leadership
The leaders of the council since 2005 have been:

Council elections

Non-metropolitan county elections
1973 Cornwall County Council election
1977 Cornwall County Council election
1981 Cornwall County Council election
1985 Cornwall County Council election (boundary changes increased the number of seats by 4)
1989 Cornwall County Council election
1993 Cornwall County Council election
1997 Cornwall County Council election
2001 Cornwall County Council election
2005 Cornwall County Council election (boundary changes reduced the number of seats by 8)

Unitary authority elections
2009 Cornwall Council election
2013 Cornwall Council election (boundary changes took place)
2017 Cornwall Council election
2021 Cornwall Council election (boundary changes took place; seats on council reduced from 123 to 87)

County result maps

By-election results

1997-2001

2001-2005

2005-2009

2009-2013

2013-2017

2017-2021

References

By-election results

External links
Cornwall Council

 
Unitary authority elections in England
Council elections in Cornwall